The Moore Haven Downtown Historic District is a U.S. historic district (designated as such on October 12, 1995) located in Moore Haven, Florida. The district runs from 3 through 99 Avenue J., 100 1st Street and Lone Cypress Park, a park which houses the only cypress tree in the district. It contains 7 historic buildings covering 22 acres.

References

External links

 Glades County listings at National Register of Historic Places
 Map of Moore Haven Downtown Historic District

Geography of Glades County, Florida
Historic districts on the National Register of Historic Places in Florida
National Register of Historic Places in Glades County, Florida